Streptomyces tendae is a bacterium species from the genus of Streptomyces which has been isolated from soil in France. Streptomyces tendae produces carbomycin, streptofactin, geosmin, cervimycin A-D and nikkomycins. Also said to be the source of Tendamistat (HOE 467), an alpha amylase inhibitor.

Further reading

See also 
 List of Streptomyces species

References

External links
Type strain of Streptomyces tendae at BacDive -  the Bacterial Diversity Metadatabase	

tendae
Bacteria described in 1958